Myristica sogeriensis is a flora species in the family Myristicaceae. It is endemic to Papua New Guinea.

References

Flora of Papua New Guinea
sogeriensis
Vulnerable plants
Taxonomy articles created by Polbot